Peter Felser (born 20 September 1969) is a German politician for the populist Alternative for Germany (AfD) and since 2017 member of the Bundestag.

Life and politics

Felser was born 1969 in the Bavarian town Dillingen an der Donau and studied at the Bundeswehr University Munich.

Felser entered the AfD in 2015 and became after the 2017 German federal election member of the bundestag.

Felser denies the scientific consensus on climate change.

References

Living people
1969 births
Members of the Bundestag 2021–2025
Members of the Bundestag 2017–2021
Members of the Bundestag for the Alternative for Germany
People from Dillingen an der Donau